Lida, Nevada is a small ghost town in Esmeralda County, Nevada, near the border with California. The GNIS classifies it as a populated place. It is located on State Route 266, north of Magruder Mountain.

The first settlement at Lida was made in 1871. A post office was in operation at Lida between 1873 and 1932.

Like other mining towns in Esmeralda County, its population sharply declined once its mines were exhausted. The site now rests on private property.

Gallery

References

External links

Lida ghost town

Populated places established in 1872
Ghost towns in Esmeralda County, Nevada
1872 establishments in Nevada
Ghost towns in Nevada